The  or  was the boar sacrificed as part of the celebration of Yule in Germanic paganism, on whose bristles solemn vows were made in some forms of a tradition known as .

Attestations

Hervarar saga ok Heiðreks
 refers to the tradition of swearing oaths on Yule Eve by laying hands on the bristles of the boar, who was then sacrificed in the :

Helgakviða Hjörvarðssonar
One of the prose segments in "" adds that the oaths were sworn while drinking the  toast:

Ynglinga saga

Scholarly reception
The association with the Yule  and with the ceremonial  gives the vows great solemnity, so that they have the force of oaths. This becomes a recurring topos in later sagas, although we have only these two saga mentions attesting to the custom of making vows on the sacrificial animal.

The choice of a boar indicates a connection with Freyr, whose mount is the gold-bristled boar , and the continuing Swedish tradition of eating pig-shaped cakes at Christmas recalls the early custom. As Jacob Grimm pointed out, the serving of a boar's head at banquets and particularly at The Queen's College, Oxford, may also be a reminiscence of the Yule boar-. Gabriel Turville-Petre suggested that names for Freyr and his sister  which equate them with a boar and a sow respectively implied that consumption of the sacrificed boar was believed to be consumption of the god's flesh and absorption of his power.

It was formerly usual to spell the word  and to interpret it as "atonement-boar" (the rare element  can also mean "sacrifice").

See also
 Germanic boar helmet
 Gullinbursti - Boar owned by Freyr
 Hildisvíni - Boar associated with Freyja
 Sæhrímnir - Boar killed and eaten each night in Valhöll

References

Sources
 . "". PBB 16 (1892) 540–44. 
 . "".  Volume 16, 1971. p. 433 

Freyr
Germanic animal sacrifice
Religious oaths
Yule
Wild boars